Magnus Weidemann was a German painter, graphic artist, photographer and writer. He was a co-founder of naturism in the life reform.

Selected exhibitions

Solo exhibitions 
 1941: Altonaer Museum, Hamburg
 1941: Grenzlandmuseum, Kunstverein Flensburg
 1950: Nissenhaus, Husum
 1990: Kleinkunst im Buchdeckel – Exlibris von Magnus Weidemann, Akademie am Meer, Volkshochschule Klappholttal
 2008: Galerie Witt, Hamburg
 Seit Jahren Dauerausstellung im Sylter Heimatmuseum, Keitum

Other 
 1907: Schwarz-Weiß-Ausstellung von Mitgliedern der Schleswig-Holsteinischen Kunstgenossenschaft, Kiel, Flensburg und Altona
 1925: Juryfreie Kunstausstellung im Kunstverein in Hamburg
 1932: Ausstellung im Altonaer Museum in Hamburg, zusammen mit Martha Vogeler
 1946: Kunstausstellung Kampen auf Sylt, Alte Sturmhaube, mit Albert Aereboe, Willy Graba, Ivo Hauptmann, Carl Hilmers, Tom Hops, Alfred Jensen, Albert Johannsen, Fritz Klimsch, Otto Larsen, Herbert Marxen, Franz Radziwill, Friedrich Schaper, Siegward Sprotte u. a.
 1983–1984: Künstlerinsel Sylt, Landesmuseum für Kunst und Kulturgeschichte auf Schloss Gottorf in Schleswig
 2003: Neuerwerbungen und Bilder aus dem Bestand des Söl'ring Foriining, Sylter Heimatmuseum, Keitum, mit Albert Aereboe, Andreas Dirks, Otto Eglau, Carl Christian Feddersen, Christian Peter Hansen, Richard Kaiser, Hugo Köcke, Franz Korwan, Ingo Kühl, Walther Kunau, Dieter Röttger, Siegward Sprotte, Helene Varges u. a.
 2003: Sylt in der Malerei, Galerie Herold, Kampen, mit Eduard Bargheer, Georg Busse (Vater von Sylta Busse), Andreas Dirks, Ernst Eitner, Christian Peter Hansen, Ivo Hauptmann, Volker Detlef Heydorn, Hugo Köcke, Franz Korwan, Siegward Sprotte u. a.
 2009: Land am Meer, Altonaer Museum, Hamburg
 2014: Die Künstler-Insel, Galerie Herold, Kampen, mit Ludwig Dettmann, Andreas Dirks, Ernst Eitner, Rainer Fetting, Willem Grimm, Ivo Hauptmann, Erich Heckel, Hugo Köcke, Ernst Kolbe, Franz Korwan, Emil Maetzel, Emil Nolde, Wilhelm Ohm, Anita Rée, Friedrich Schaper u. a.
 2015: Die Kunst und das Wattenmeer – 30 Jahre Nationalpark Wattenmeer, Kunstverein Fischerhude
 2015–2016: Die Kunst und das Wattenmeer – 30 Jahre Nationalpark Wattenmeer, Schloss Ritzebüttel, Cuxhaven
 2016: Lange nicht gesehen, Sylter Heimatmuseum, Keitum, mit Hugo Köcke, Ernst Mollenhauer, Siegward Sprotte u. a.
 2018: Rendezvous!, Sylter Heimatmuseum, Keitum, mit Carl Christian Feddersen, Wenzel Hablik, Horst Janssen, Boy Lornsen, Dieter Röttger, Siegward Sprotte, Helene Varges u. a.

Selected works 
Maße: Höhe × Breite
 1919: Klosterkirche von Preetz, Bleistift auf Papier, 8,8 × 16 cm (Bildträger 21,3 × 30,3 cm) – Schleswig-Holsteinische Landesbibliothek
 1921: Badende, Sylt, Gemälde – Museumsberg Flensburg
 1924: Ukleisee, Öl auf Leinwand – Ostholstein-Museum Eutin
 1925: Wandgemälde Dünen und Watt auf Sylt, Rotes Kliff, Morsum-Kliff, Binnendünen am Rande der Kremper Marsch, Tunneltal bei Ratzeburg – Altonaer Museum, Hamburg
 1926: Morsumer Heide, Öl auf Holz, 47 × 67 cm – Sylter Heimatmuseum, Keitum
 1926: Akt am Meer, Tusche auf Pappe, 24,4 × 35 cm – Sylter Heimatmuseum, Keitum
 1927: Strand vor Westerland, Öl auf Pappe, 60 × 83 cm (Rahmenmaß) – Sylter Heimatmuseum, Keitum
 1927: Dünental, Öl auf Pappe, 105 × 75 cm – Sylter Heimatmuseum, Keitum
 1929: Dünen im Schnee, Öl auf Pappe, 65 × 94,5 cm – Sylter Heimatmuseum, Keitum
 1929: Heide bei Tauwetter, Ölgemälde, 64 × 94 cm – NordseeMuseum Husum
 1932: Die Seemannsgräber, Gemälde – NordseeMuseum Husum
 1933: Düne, Öl auf Pappe, 23 × 31,5 cm (Pappe 35,5 × 44 cm) – Sylter Heimatmuseum, Keitum
 1934: Der Harhoog (Abendstimmung), Skizze, Aquarell auf Papier, 8,5 × 15 cm – Sylter Heimatmuseum, Keitum
 1935: Waldweg im Schnee, Öl auf Hartfaserplatte, 66 × 41 cm – Sylter Heimatmuseum, Keitum
 1936: Germaniawerft, Öl auf Pappe, 50 × 69,5 cm – Stadtmuseum Warleberger Hof, Kiel
 1938: Kampener Vogelkoje, Tempera, Lack und Deckfarbe auf Papier, auf Spanplatte geklebt, 55 × 75 cm – Sylter Heimatmuseum, Keitum
 1938: Biikefeuer auf Keitum, Öl auf Leinwand, 72 × 85 cm – NordseeMuseum Husum
 1938: Nordische Landschaft, Dünental im Winter, Öl auf Pappe, 20,2 × 29,3 cm – Sylter Heimatmuseum, Keitum
 1940: Eisstauung bei Keitum, Öl auf Hartfaserplatte, 49,5 × 23,5 cm – Sylter Heimatmuseum, Keitum
 1941: Kirche und Friedhof in Nebel, Gemälde – NordseeMuseum Husum
 1942: Gräber der unbekannten Seeleute, Öl auf Spanplatte, 66,5 × 105 cm – Sylter Heimatmuseum, Keitum
 1943: Morsum Kliff auf Sylt, Öl auf Pappe, 51 × 73 cm – Sylter Heimatmuseum, Keitum
 1944: Weg am Kellersee, Aquarell auf Karton, 49,5 × 73 cm – Sylter Heimatmuseum, Keitum
 1945: Harhoog in Keitum, Aquarell auf Papier, 19 × 42 cm – Sylter Heimatmuseum, Keitum
 1945: Winterlandschaft an der Förde bei Glücksburg, Öl auf Spanplatte, 69 × 55 cm – Museumsberg Flensburg
 1946: Urwald Kampener Vogelkoje, Öl auf Leinwand, 65,5 × 91 cm – Sylter Heimatmuseum, Keitum
 1946: Sommerglanz (Nordsee), Aquarell auf Papier, mit Pappe unterlegt, 23,7 × 30,2 cm – Sylter Heimatmuseum, Keitum
 1948: Gebäude, das von einem Friesenwall abgegrenzt wird, Skizze, Aquarell auf Papier, 15 × 23,5 cm – Sylter Heimatmuseum, Keitum
 1948: Landschaft mit blühender Heide, Skizze, Aquarell auf Papier, 10,5 × 15 cm – Sylter Heimatmuseum, Keitum
 1949: Keitum Kliff, Skizze, Aquarell auf Papier, 10 × 16 cm – Sylter Heimatmuseum, Keitum
 1950er Jahre: Hünengrab in der Heide, Skizze, Aquarell auf Papier, 11 × 15 cm – Sylter Heimatmuseum, Keitum
 1953: Schale mit Enzian, Aquarell auf Papier, mit Pappe unterlegt, 21 × 24,2 cm – Sylter Heimatmuseum, Keitum
 1954: Meer an der Kaimauer, Aquarell auf Leinwand, 13 × 16,5 cm – Sylter Heimatmuseum, Keitum
 1955: Sonnenfunken, Öl auf Hartfaserplatte, 69 × 52 cm – Sylter Heimatmuseum, Keitum
 1956: Hünengrab im Schnee, Skizze, Aquarell auf Papier, 10,5 × 14,5 cm – Sylter Heimatmuseum, Keitum
 1957: Strandastern im Schilf, Öl auf Hartfaserplatte, 61 × 49 cm – Sylter Heimatmuseum, Keitum
 1958: Heide auf Sylt, Öl auf Spanplatte, 61 × 92 cm – Sylter Heimatmuseum, Keitum
 1958: Schilf am Watt, Öl auf Leinwand, 57 × 76 cm – Sylter Heimatmuseum, Keitum
 1958: Meereslandschaft, Wattenmeer, Öl auf Spanplatte – Sylter Heimatmuseum, Keitum
 1958: Der Klöwenhoog, Skizze, Aquarell auf Papier, 9 × 13 cm – Sylter Heimatmuseum, Keitum
 1958: Heide bei Munkmarsch, Öl auf Hartfaserplatte, 61 × 46 cm – Sylter Heimatmuseum, Keitum
 1958: Sylt: Keitum – Strand, Öl auf Hartfaserplatte, 61 × 40 cm – Sylter Heimatmuseum, Keitum
 1958: Hoyer-Stieg in Keitum, Öl auf Hartfaserplatte, 68,5 × 48,5 cm – Sylter Heimatmuseum, Keitum
 1958: Watt, Aquarell und Kugelschreiber auf Papier, 23,3 × 29,4 cm (Rahmenmaß) – Sylter Heimatmuseum, Keitum
 1959: Hünengrab in der Heide bei Munkmarsch, Skizze, Aquarell auf Papier, 8 × 11 cm – Sylter Heimatmuseum, Keitum
 1959: Der (ehemalige) Harhoog, bei Keitum, Aquarell und Kugelschreiber auf Papier, mit Pappe unterlegt, 21,7 × 30,8 cm – Sylter Heimatmuseum, Keitum
 1960: Hünengrab bei Keitum, Öl auf Hartfaserplatte – Sylter Heimatmuseum, Keitum
 1960: Der Harhoog in Keitum, Aquarell und Kugelschreiber auf Papier, mit Pappe unterlegt, 33,8 × 46,3 cm – Sylter Heimatmuseum, Keitum
 1960: Blühende Felder (auf Sylt), Aquarell, 45 × 49 cm – NordseeMuseum Husum
 1961: Heidetal bei Munkmarsch, Öl auf Hartfaserplatte, 68 × 41 cm – Sylter Heimatmuseum, Keitum
 1963: Dünen- und Heidelandschaft, Öl auf Leinwand, 68 × 89 cm – Sylter Heimatmuseum, Keitum
 1963: Strandastern hinterm Deich, Öl auf Hartfaserplatte, 72 × 42 cm – Sylter Heimatmuseum, Keitum
 1965: Salzwiese mit Priel, Öl auf Hartfaserplatte – Sylter Heimatmuseum, Keitum
 1965: Watt vor Keitum, Aquarell und Bleistift auf Papier, mit Pappe unterlegt, 10,3 × 14,8 cm – Sylter Heimatmuseum, Keitum
 1966: Goldgras und Heide, Öl auf Hartfaserplatte, 61 × 38 cm – Sylter Heimatmuseum, Keitum

References 

1880 births
1967 deaths
20th-century Lutheran clergy
20th-century photographers
German painters
Landscape painters
Marine artists
German printmakers
Erotic photographers
German Red Cross personnel